Paul Caplin (born 31 December 1954 in London, England) is an English businessman, musician, videographer and entrepreneur. Caplin studied as a mathematician at Imperial College, London and at Cambridge University. His career has spanned music, information technology and filmmaking.

Musical career 
Caplin began his musical career in his early twenties in the New Romantic rock group Animal Magnet, and co-wrote their dance track, "Welcome to the Monkey House" (1981). Animal Magnet supported Duran Duran on their first national tour.

He left Animal Magnet to become the “mastermind” behind the 1980s avant-garde new wave pop project Haysi Fantayzee, the other members being Jeremy Healy and Caplin's then girlfriend, Kate Garner. Their music combined reggae, country, and electro with political and sociological lyrics couched as nursery rhymes.

The group disbanded after releasing three hit singles, and an album that went gold. Caplin then launched his own record label, The Love Organization. This had success with Marilyn, who became popular during the mid-1980s vogue for sexually ambivalent pop stars. Caplin managed Marilyn and co-wrote his hit songs.

In 1994, he was executive producer of Pavarotti in Confidence with Peter Ustinov for the BBC.

Business career 
After running a small group of music production and publishing companies, in 1985 Caplin launched Caplin Cybernetics Corporation, a computer hardware and software developer and a pioneer of machine vision and parallel computing technology.

Caplin Cybernetics became an IBM business partner and was later acquired by the Infinet Group, a diversified group of IT services companies of which Caplin was co-founder and chief executive.

In 2000, Caplin founded FinTech innovator Caplin Systems Ltd and served as its chief executive and chairman until the company’s sale in 2015. Caplin Systems pioneered the distribution of real-time financial data via the web, and built some of the earliest online trading platforms for investment banks.

In 2001, he received an Ernst & Young Entrepreneur of the Year award for his work with the company., and in both 2002 and 2009 Caplin Systems was featured in the Sunday Times Tech Track 100 as one of the fastest-growing technology firms in Britain.

In 2015, Caplin Systems was acquired by Ion Capital Management.

Personal life 
Caplin is married to singer Zeeteah Massiah, with whom he writes and produces music. They have released two albums together: Juice (2014) and Maybe Tomorrow (2016).

References

External links
 Financial Times article about Paul Caplin
 Imperial College article about Paul Caplin
 Caplin Systems company website
 Caplin & Massiah official website

Living people
1954 births
English new wave musicians
English keyboardists
English record producers
English songwriters
English chief executives